Nikolai Sachenko (born 1977) is a Russian violinist. He was awarded the top prize at the International Tchaikovsky Competition in 1998. Since 2008, he has been a member of the Brahms Trio, with pianist Natalia Rubinstein and cellist Kirill Rodin. In 2022, he joined the Borodin Quartet as first violinist.

Biography
Sachenko was born in 1977 in Alma Ata, the capital of the Kazakh Soviet Socialist Republic (now Kazakhstan). When he was six years old, he began studying violin at a music school in Petropavlovsk-Kamchatsky. In 1995, Sachenko participated in the 3rd International Violin Competition Leopold Mozart, where he finished in 4th place and won the Audience Prize. At the age of 21, he was named the top violinist at the 11th International Tchaikovsky Competition in 1998, playing a violin made by the 18th-century French luthier . Russia dominated the competition that year: in addition to Sachenko, the pianist Denis Matsuev and the cellist  were awarded the top prizes in their respective categories. Sachenko embarked on an international concert tour after winning the competition.

Sachenko has been a member of the Brahms Trio since 2008, performing with the pianist Natalia Rubinstein and the cellist Kirill Rodin. The trio's focus is on infrequently-performed piano trios by Russian composers from the late 19th and early 20th centuries. His performances as part of the Brahms Trio have received critical praise. Tully Potter, writing for Musical Opinion, commented that Sachenko's "focused playing is an unfailing pleasure", and David Morrison of Fanfare described his playing as "eloquently expressive and impassioned". In 2017, he was named a Merited Artist of the Russian Federation. In September 2022 he joined the Borodin Quartet as new first violinist following the retirement of Ruben Aharonian.

As of 2021, Sachenko plays a violin made by the Italian luthier Francesco Rugeri in 1697 that belongs to Russia's State Collection of Unique Musical Instruments. He has cited the violinists Yehudi Menuhin and Isaac Stern and the cellist Mstislav Rostropovich among his influences.

References

External links
Violin Concerto (Tchaikovsky): Excerpt from Sachenko's performance at the International Tchaikovsky Competition

1977 births
20th-century classical violinists
21st-century classical violinists
20th-century Russian male musicians
21st-century Russian male musicians
Concertmasters
Honored Artists of the Russian Federation
Living people
Male classical violinists
Moscow Conservatory alumni
People from Almaty
Prize-winners of the International Tchaikovsky Competition
Russian classical violinists